American Samoa Community College (ASCC) is a public land-grant community college in the village of Mapusaga, American Samoa. Only legal residents of American Samoa who have graduated from high school or obtained a General Equivalency Diploma are admitted to ASCC.

It is American Samoa's only tertiary education institution. The main Mapusaga campus has a variety of Associate degree programs. Also associated with the college are a nursing school at LBJ Hospital and vocational facilities in the Tafuna Industrial Complex.

ASCC awarded 139 degrees and certificates in 2016, including 75 Associate of Arts degrees, 60 Associate of Science degrees, 3 Certificate of Proficiency, and one Bachelor in Elementary Education. In 2016, the college had 1,254 enrolled full-time students and 553 enrolled part-time. Around 27 percent majored in liberal arts but other popular majors were business management, accounting, criminal justice, education, nursing and health science.

History
American Samoa Community College was established in 1970. It started its first year with 474 attending school in Utulei at the old navy buildings that once were the High School of American Samoa (now Samoana High School). Enrollment increased to 550 in the fall of 1971 and 872 by the spring of 1972. The college originally offered an associate degree and transfer to baccalaureate-granting colleges. It offered vocational, teacher, adult education and manpower training. Nurse training was added in 1976. The college was granted one-year accreditation in 1973 and received entitlement to funds under the Higher Education Act of 1963. When the Church of Jesus Christ of Latter-day Saints closed its Mapusaga High School in 1974, the government of American Samoa purchased the buildings for $1.5 million, signed a 50-year lease for the 20-acre property, and moved the college here. The college received accreditation from the Commission of Junior Colleges, Western Association of Schools and Colleges in 1976. The college's new wing was constructed in 1978 at a cost of $3.5 million. ASCC received a $1.5 million federal grant in 1978 in order to establish a Teacher Corps project to improve the teaching quality.

The college was established in 1970 as part of the American Samoa Department of Education to provide residents the opportunity to enjoy postsecondary education in the liberal arts, teacher training, vocational-technical education, and general education.  The first freshman class had only 131 students. The school moved into a few buildings on the island before moving permanently to its current location in Mapusaga in 1974.

In 1979, the U.S. Economic Development Administration provided a grant that allowed the college to add five modern buildings for the fine arts, nursing, science, and vocational training.  ASCC was also able to add a cafeteria and a gymnasium. A new library was added in 2003. New administrative offices, lecture hall and two new teacher education classrooms were added in 2008. The computer and science labs were renovated and upgraded with funding from the American Reinvestment and Recovery Act in 2011. Groundbreaking for the Multi-Purpose Center was initiated in 2013.

The Health Care Center at ASCC opened in November 1985. The college also began a program to enable local nurses to take national tests as registered and licensed practical nurses.

Samoan artist Sven Ortquist has been an artist-in-residence at the college.

Academics
ASCC offers Associate of Arts and Associate of Science degrees, as well as certificate programs. It is accredited by the Accrediting Commission for Community and Junior Colleges.

Student body
93 percent of students are residents of American Samoa; however, only 24 percent have Samoan citizenship. Roughly 23 percent are over the age of 26. Around 75 percent of enrolled students are full-time students, while first-year students make up 47 percent of the total student body.

Notable alumni
Lemanu Peleti Mauga, Governor of American Samoa
Lutu T. S. Fuimaono, the longest-serving member of the American Samoa Senate

Notable faculty 
Mike Gabbard
Salu Hunkin-Finau, former President of American Samoa Community College
Sa'eu Scanlan, the college's first Samoan president
Galeai Moaaliitele Tuufuli

See also
 List of universities in Polynesia

References

External links

Universities and colleges in American Samoa
Community colleges in the United States
Buildings and structures in American Samoa
Tutuila
Educational institutions established in 1970
Schools accredited by the Western Association of Schools and Colleges
1970 establishments in American Samoa